Endotricha affinitalis is a species of snout moth in the genus Endotricha. It was described by Hering in 1901, and is known from Sumatra.

References

Moths described in 1901
Endotrichini